Football Club Laufen,  is a football club from Laufen, Switzerland.

The club was founded in 1908, is currently playing in the Swiss 1. Liga.

External links
 Official site

Football clubs in Switzerland
Association football clubs established in 1908
1908 establishments in Switzerland